This is a list of diplomatic missions of Singapore. Singapore opened its first diplomatic missions in Jakarta, Kuala Lumpur, and New York City in the first few months after gaining independence in 1965. The country currently maintains 50 representative offices in 33 countries and territories.

Africa

Americas

Asia

Europe

Oceania

Multinational organisations

Gallery

See also
 List of High Commissioners and Ambassadors of Singapore
 List of Consuls of Singapore
 Foreign relations of Singapore
 List of diplomatic missions in Singapore
 Visa policy of Singapore

References

Ministry of Foreign Affairs of Singapore

 
Singapore
Diplomatic missions of Singapore